Birch Branch is a stream in Vernon County in the U.S. state of Missouri. It is a tributary of Little Dry Wood Creek.

Birch Branch most likely was so named on account of birch timber in the area.

See also
List of rivers of Missouri

References

Rivers of Vernon County, Missouri
Rivers of Missouri